Barna Kabay (born 15 August 1948, Budapest) is a Hungarian film director, screenwriter and film producer. His film The Revolt of Job (1983), which he co-directed with Imre Gyöngyössy, was nominated for the Academy Award for Best Foreign Language Film.

Selected filmography
 Job's Revolt (1983)
 Yerma (1984)

External links

1948 births
Living people
Hungarian film directors
Hungarian screenwriters
Male screenwriters
Hungarian male writers
Hungarian film producers